Ryan O'Nan (born March 25, 1982) is an American actor, writer, and director best known for his role as King George in Queen of the South.

Career
In 2009, O'Nan had a recurring role on the crime drama series The Unusuals. In 2010, he starred in the drama film The Dry Land.  He also had a role as Jared Hale in the pilot episode of the FX series, Justified. In 2011, he wrote, directed, and starred in the comedy film The Brooklyn Brothers Beat the Best. In 2012, he appeared in the crime film The Iceman and the comedy film Watching TV with the Red Chinese. In 2013, he starred in two thriller films, Altered Minds and The Frozen Ground.

In 2014, he starred as the titular role in The Blacklist episode The Alchemist, before appearing in several episodes of Ray Donovan. In 2015, he was cast in the western film Echoes of War, starred in the action film Vice, and appeared in the horror film Anguish. In 2017, he gained notability when he starred as King George in the second season onward of Queen of the South, going on to co-producing the third season. In 2018, he was cast in Kevin Smith's horror comedy film KillRoy Was Here. In October 2020, he joined the cast of the 2021 film Copshop.

Filmography

Film

Television

References

External links
 

Living people
1982 births
21st-century American male actors
American male actors
American male television actors
Place of birth missing (living people)